Río Congo is a corregimiento in Chepigana District, Darién Province, Panama with a population of 1,540 as of 2010. Its population as of 1990 was 2,454; its population as of 2000 was 1,549.

References

Corregimientos of Darién Province
Road-inaccessible communities of Panama